A by-election was held for the New South Wales Legislative Assembly electorate of Balmain on 10 July 1890 because John Hawthorne resigned due to bankruptcy.

Dates

Result

John Hawthorne resigned due to bankruptcy.

See also
Electoral results for the district of Balmain
List of New South Wales state by-elections

References

1890 elections in Australia
New South Wales state by-elections
1890s in New South Wales